Felix Erdmann (born 4 April 1978 in Mülheim) is a German rowing cox.

References 
 

1978 births
Living people
German male rowers
Sportspeople from Mülheim
Coxswains (rowing)
World Rowing Championships medalists for Germany
20th-century German people
21st-century German people